Tazehabad (also Romanized as Tāzehābād; also known as Tāzehābād-e Pasīkhān) is a village in Pasikhan Rural District, in the Central District of Rasht County, Gilan Province, Iran. At the 2006 census, its population was 210, in 53 families.

References 

Populated places in Rasht County